Khaled El Ghandour (born 27 July 1970) is an Egyptian former footballer who played as a midfielder.

Club career 
One of the most decorated players in the history of Zamalek, El Ghandour scored many goals during his career, having also played short stints at Kazma and Tersana, where he ended his career.

International career
El Ghandour represented Egypt internationally in the 1992 Summer Olympics and the 1994 African Cup of Nations.

Honours
Zamalek
 Egyptian Premier League: 1992–93, 2000–01, 2002–03 , 2003–04
 Egypt Cup: 1999, 2002
 Egyptian Super Cup: 2001, 2002
 CAF Champions League: 1993, 1996, 2002
 African Cup Winners' Cup: 2000
 CAF Super Cup: 1994, 1997, 2003
 Arab Club Champions Cup: 2003
 Saudi-Egyptian Super Cup: 2003
Kazma
 Kuwait Emir Cup: 1997

References

External links
 

1970 births
Living people
Egyptian footballers
Association football midfielders
Zamalek SC players
Tersana SC players
Kazma SC players
Egyptian Premier League players
Kuwait Premier League players
Egypt international footballers
1994 African Cup of Nations players
Egyptian expatriate footballers
Egyptian expatriate sportspeople in Kuwait
Expatriate footballers in Kuwait